Michael Lee Develin (born August 27, 1980) is an American mathematician known for his work in combinatorics and discrete geometry.

Early life
Mike Develin was born in Hobart, Tasmania. He moved to the United States with his Korean mother, living in New York City. He attended Stuyvesant High School, where he was captain of the math team, and entered Harvard University at the age of 16. At 22, he received his PhD from UC Berkeley, doing his dissertation on Topics in Discrete Geometry. He was awarded the 2003 American Institute of Mathematics five-year fellowship.

Mathematics
Develin is a 2-time Putnam fellow in 1997 and 1998. He studied under advisor Bernd Sturmfels at UC-Berkeley, and has been noted for work on Stanley's reciprocity theorem and tight spans. His 2004 paper, "Tropical Convexity", with Sturmfels, is regarded as one of the seminal papers of tropical geometry, garnering over 300 citations to date.

Facebook
Develin worked on data science for Facebook and Instagram from 2011 to 2018.

On January 23, 2014, Develin published a satirical note on behalf of Facebook's data science team, predicting the demise of Princeton University, in response to a research paper by Princeton PhD candidates predicting the demise of Facebook.

Bridge
Develin started playing competitive bridge in 2005.

Wins
 Manfield Non-Life Master Pairs 2005
 Grand National Teams Flight B 2007
 South American Junior Championships 2007 
 Red Ribbon Pairs 2008
 0-10,000 Fast Pairs 2022

Runner-up
 North American Pairs Flight C 2006
 Mini-Spingold II 2007

Personal life
Develin was naturalized as an American citizen in 2010.

Develin organized and maintains SimBase, a simulated baseball league with fictitious players, whose inaugural members also included Jeopardy! champion Joon Pahk.

Develin occasionally set up a "free advice" table near the San Francisco Ferry Building.

He currently resides in Kirkland, Washington.

References

External links
 Mike's "Free Advice" tabling homepage
 

1980 births
American contract bridge players
20th-century American mathematicians
21st-century American mathematicians
Harvard University alumni
Living people
Stuyvesant High School alumni
University of California, Berkeley alumni
Mathematicians from New York (state)
Australian emigrants to the United States
Putnam Fellows